Marcos Antônio Senna da Silva (born 17 July 1976), known as Senna, is a retired professional footballer who played as a central midfielder.

He was mainly known for his passing range and long-range shooting and was also a penalty specialist. He spent most of his professional career in Spain with Villarreal, appearing in 363 official matches during 11 seasons, 10 of which were in La Liga (33 goals scored). He ended his career with the New York Cosmos, with whom he twice won the Soccer Bowl.

Born in Brazil, Senna represented the Spain national team during a four-year spell, appearing at the 2006 World Cup and Euro 2008, and winning the latter tournament as starter.

Club career

Villarreal
Born in São Paulo, Senna began his career with Rio Branco Esporte Clube. After playing for a number of Brazilian clubs early in his career he moved to Spanish side Villarreal CF in 2002, from Associação Desportiva São Caetano. He only made 25 La Liga appearances in his first two seasons combined, however this was mainly due to a serious knee injury he picked up in August 2003. However, after recovering from his injury he became an undisputed starter, helping the club reach as far as the UEFA Champions League semi-finals in 2005–06; eventually, he also gained the club captaincy.

In the summer of 2006, Senna almost joined Manchester United: he had one year left on his contract, and Villarreal were prepared to sell him for a fee of around £4 million. However, the deal was put on hold while United pursued Owen Hargreaves, but FC Bayern Munich refused to sell their player and, when United returned with a bid for Senna on transfer deadline day, Villarreal rejected their advances; he had become frustrated with the delays to his proposed move and decided to stay at Villarreal, signing a three-year extension shortly after the transfer window closed.

On 27 April 2008, Senna scored a goal from inside the centre circle against Real Betis that he deemed "the best goal of my life". That season, as the player netted a further three times in a total of 33 matches, Villarreal finished a club-best second, to champions Real Madrid.

After nearly two seasons marred with physical problems, 35-year-old Senna returned to full fitness for 2011–12, as the Valencian Community side's playmaker. On 21 March 2012, he scored from a free kick for the 83rd-minute home equaliser against Real Madrid (1–1), but his team would be eventually relegated after a twelve-year stay in the top level.

New York Cosmos

On 13 June 2013, after helping Villarreal return to the top flight, Senna signed with newly formed North American Soccer League club New York Cosmos for an undisclosed fee. He made his debut in the team's inaugural match on 3 August, a 2–1 win over the Fort Lauderdale Strikers, and scored his first goal on 1 September in a 1–1 draw at FC Edmonton. In his first year with the team he was named the league's player of the week on two occasions, and also helped to wins in the NASL Fall Championship and the Soccer Bowl, scoring the game-winner in the final championship match against the Atlanta Silverbacks.

On 13 November 2013, Senna was awarded a testimonial match by Villarreal, featuring in a 3–0 win over the Cosmos: he started the game and set up Jérémy Perbet for the first goal. In his honour, the crowd broke out in a full minute of applause that started in the 19th minute (the jersey he wore), and he played the second half with the North American before leaving the pitch with 20 minutes to go to another standing ovation.

Senna netted his first goal of the season on 12 May 2014, scoring the game-winner in a 1–0 home win over the Spring season champions Minnesota United FC, who were handed their only loss in the competition. His second came on 9 August, as he connected on a spectacular second half free kick to help the Cosmos come from behind to win it 2–1 at the Silverbacks; he helped the club to the third position in the combined standings as well as a berth in The Championship, being nominated to the NASL Team of the Week four times, second best in the squad.

On 10 June 2015, one month shy of his 39th birthday, Senna announced he would retire as a player at the end of the Fall season. His final game was the Soccer Bowl on 15 November, which his team won 3–2 against Ottawa Fury FC, also the swansong of his national teammate Raúl.

International career

Senna was granted Spanish citizenship in early 2006 and was part of the Spanish squad for the 2006 FIFA World Cup and UEFA Euro 2008. His debut came on 1 March in a friendly match with Ivory Coast, played in Valladolid.

In the quarter-finals of the latter competition, Senna scored the third of Spain's four converted penalties, which resulted in the nation progressing to the semifinals at the expense of Italy, winning 4–2 in the shootout. He played the full duration of the final – a 1–0 win over Germany – and was named in UEFA's squad for the competition. Some pundits and journalists also named Senna as their player of the tournament.

Senna's first international goal came against Armenia on 10 September 2008, a 4–0 win in the 2010 World Cup qualifying campaign. On 20 May 2010, after an irregular season with Villarreal, with several physical problems, the 33-year-old was left out of Spain's final 23-man squad, with FC Barcelona's Sergio Busquets starting in his place as the national team went on to win the FIFA World Cup in South Africa.

Personal life
Senna's younger brother, Márcio, was also a footballer. Marcos Assunção, who represented A.S. Roma and Betis amongst other clubs, is his cousin, and both were also midfielders.

Senna is a Christian, and he spoke about his faith in the documentary "The Prize: Chasing the Dream", along with Kaká. He is also a member of the International Christian ministry Athletes in Action.

Along with Raúl Albiol and Guillermo Franco, in 2008 Senna founded Evangélico FC, an organisation consisting of 140 athletes and 16 coaches which sought to promote Christian values among young athletes in Spain.

Career statistics

Club

International
Scores and results list Spain's goal tally first, score column indicates score after each Senna goal.

Honours
Corinthians
Campeonato Brasileiro Série A: 1999
Campeonato Paulista: 1999, 2001
FIFA Club World Cup: 2000

Villarreal
UEFA Intertoto Cup: 2003, 2004

New York Cosmos
North American Soccer League: 2013 Fall Championship, 2015 Spring Championship
Soccer Bowl: 2013, 2015
North American Supporters' Trophy: 2015

Spain
UEFA European Championship: 2008

Individual
UEFA European Championship: Team of the tournament 2008
Don Balón Award – Spanish Player of the Year: 2008

See also
List of Spain international footballers born outside Spain

References

External links

 
 
 
 

1976 births
Living people
Brazilian emigrants to Spain
Naturalised citizens of Spain
Brazilian Christians
Spanish Christians
Footballers from São Paulo
Brazilian footballers
Spanish footballers
Spanish sportspeople of African descent
Association football midfielders
Campeonato Brasileiro Série A players
Rio Branco Esporte Clube players
América Futebol Clube (SP) players
Sport Club Corinthians Paulista players
Esporte Clube Juventude players
Associação Desportiva São Caetano players
La Liga players
Segunda División players
Villarreal CF players
North American Soccer League players
New York Cosmos (2010) players
Spain international footballers
2006 FIFA World Cup players
UEFA Euro 2008 players
UEFA European Championship-winning players
Brazilian expatriate footballers
Spanish expatriate footballers
Expatriate footballers in Spain
Expatriate soccer players in the United States
Spanish expatriate sportspeople in the United States
Naturalised association football players